Whitehall, Arkansas may refer to:

 Whitehall, Lee County, Arkansas, a place in Arkansas
 Whitehall, Poinsett County, Arkansas 
 Whitehall, Yell County, Arkansas, a place in Arkansas

See also
 White Hall, Arkansas